The delicate vesper mouse (Calomys tener) is a South American rodent species of the family Cricetidae. It is found in Argentina, Bolivia and Brazil. Its karyotype has 2n = 66 and FN = 66.

References 

Itis.gov

Calomys
Mammals of Brazil
Mammals described in 1888
Taxa named by Herluf Winge